Edward Ernest Wallington (8 July 1895 – 15 February 1959) was an English footballer.

Born in Rickmansworth, Hertfordshire, Wallington started his working life as an amateur in local football, and also played regularly for Watford reserves. He turned professional in 1920, coinciding with Watford's entry into the Football League, and made his first professional appearance on 16 March 1921, in a 1–1 draw to Gillingham at Priestfield Stadium. He scored his first goal exactly one month later, in another 1–1 draw, at home to Crystal Palace at Vicarage Road, and finished the season with 9 appearances and 1 goal.

Wallington established himself as a first-team regular in the 1921–22 season, making 40 appearances in all competitions. However, he lost his place to Jimmy Stephenson four games into the following season, and never played a first-team match for the club again. He was released on a free transfer in June 1923, and joined First Division side Arsenal three months later. After making one first team appearance in 1923–24, Wallington left the club, and later returned to amateur football.

He died on 15 February 1959, aged 63.

References

1895 births
1959 deaths
People from Rickmansworth
English footballers
Association football wingers
Watford F.C. players
Arsenal F.C. players
English Football League players